Adamas is a genus of sawflies belonging to the family Tenthredinidae. It is sometimes referred to in the literature under the name Dinax, but this name is a junior homonym of a name validly published in 1848; claims that the 1848 name was not validly published (e.g.) have been subsequently refuted.

Species
 Adamas caudatus Nie & Wei, 2004
 Adamas ermak Zhelochovtsev, 1968
 Adamas jakowleffi (Konow, 1897)
 Adamas lui Nie & Wei, 2004
 Adamas parallelus Nie & Wei, 2004
 Adamas xui Nie & Wei, 2004

References

Tenthredinidae
Sawfly genera